Gadia is the twelfth month of the Mandaean calendar.

Light fasting is practiced by Mandaeans on the 28th and 29th days of Gadia. The 30th and last day of Gadia is Kanshiy u-Zahly, or New Year's Eve. Mandaeans clean and wash the whole household, perform baptism, and buying new clothes in preparation for the New Year. At sunset, Mandaeans will close their doors and stay inside for 36 hours to commemorate the assembly of the angels in heaven.

It is the Mandaic name for the constellation Capricorn. It currently corresponds to Jun / Jul in the Gregorian calendar due to a lack of a leap year in the Mandaean calendar.

References

Months of the Mandaean calendar
Capricorn in astrology